At least two ships of the French Navy have been named Oiseau:

   a 30-gun frigate launched in 1757 and captured by the Royal Navy in 1762
  a 26-gun frigate launched in 1769 and captured by the Royal Navy in 1779

French Navy ship names